Connor Wynne (born 15 January 2001) is an English professional rugby league footballer who plays as a  or er for Newcastle Thunder in the RFL Championship, on short-term loan from the Betfred Super League side Hull F.C.

He has spent time on loan from Hull at Doncaster in Betfred League 1 and the York City Knights in the Betfred Championship .

Background
Wynne was born in Kingston upon Hull, East Riding of Yorkshire, England.

Playing career

Hull F.C.
In 2019, he made his Super League début for Hull F.C. against the Salford Red Devils.
In round 11 of the 2022 Super League season, he scored a hat-trick in Hull F.C.'s 48-12 win over Toulouse Olympique.

York City
On 21 April 2021, it was reported that he had signed for York City in the RFL Championship on a short-term loan.

References

External links
Hull FC profile

2001 births
Living people
Doncaster R.L.F.C. players
English rugby league players
Hull F.C. players
Newcastle Thunder players
Rugby league fullbacks
Rugby league players from Kingston upon Hull
York City Knights players